Assuranceforeningen Skuld is an international marine insurance company based in Oslo, Norway that specializes in protection and indemnity insurance and marine insurance. Total premium income for 2018/19 was US$402 million. In addition to Oslo, Skuld has offices in Bergen, Bermuda, Copenhagen, Hamburg, Hong Kong, London, New York, Piraeus, Singapore and Tokyo.

History 
Skuld was established in 1897 in Oslo, Norway, as the first P&I Club outside the United Kingdom. The name has its origins in Norse mythology, according to which Skuld is one of the powerful goddesses known as norns who weave the threads of destiny. The purpose of the association is "mutual insurance against liabilities and losses incurred by members in direct connection with the operation of the entered vessels".

Present status 
As a mutual association, the club has no shareholders and is owned and controlled directly by its insured shipowners, who are known as members of the club and are entitled to vote at the general meeting according to the gross tonnage of the ships entered in the association.  The members elect a committee of between 12 and 30 members which meets twice a year, and a board of directors consisting of between five and nine members.  The conditions of membership and terms of insurance are contained in the statutes and rules.

Skuld underwent a major restructuring in the period 2000 to 2003 which led to a substantial improvement in its financial strength and Standard & Poor's rating of A with a stable outlook. It also led to diversification into other marine insurance, including non-mutual. The annual report for the insurance year ending 20 February 2019 records assets of more than US$1 billion and a contingency reserve of $453 million. At the commencement the 2019/2020 insurance year, the entered tonnage for liability insurance reached 103 million gross tons. Some 22% of the tonnage entered continues to be Scandinavian-controlled. Skuld is also a leading provider of charterers' liability insurance.

Skuld is one of thirteen members of the International Group of P&I Clubs that work closely together in reinsurance and industry matters of common interest. The P&I Clubs in the International Group provide insurance for the liabilities of approximately 90% of the world's merchant fleet.

In December 2010, Skuld announced that it had also entered the Lloyd's market.

1 January 2011, Skuld opened as the first P&I club, a syndicate at Lloyd's, Skuld 1897.

1 January 2017, Skuld acquired Gerling Norway, a global specialist in mainly Hull Insurance – now renamed Skuld Marine Agency or SMA.

In July 2019 Skuld closed down its activities at Lloyd's London.

Scope of insurance 
The P&I ("Protection and Indemnity") insurance provided by Skuld to its members is primarily to cover the liabilities which they incur to third parties arising out of the operation of their ships. The common types of claim which are covered are for death or injury to passengers and crew, oil pollution, cargo loss or damage, collision, wreck removal and stowaways. Shipowners' exposure to these claims has grown in line with increasing regulation of the shipping industry through International Conventions adopted by the International Maritime Organization as well as by domestic or regional legislation.

Skuld has been involved in a number of high-profile cases, including the Estonia, Hebei Spirit, Braer, Sea Empress and Scandinavian Star.

Skuld also provides shipowners and charterers with additional types of cover. This includes cover for legal assistance and legal costs ("defence" cover) as well as insurance for operators of units in the offshore and energy sector.

In Skuld Marine Agency, Skuld is offering mainly hull and machinery insurance and associated products, with a possibility to write claims lead on selected fleets.

References

External links 
Skuld home page
International Group of P&I Clubs

P&I clubs
Cooperatives in Norway
Companies based in Oslo
Financial services companies established in 1897
Insurance companies of Norway
Norwegian companies established in 1897